Brigadier Sir Arthur Brian Sherlock Heywood Gooch, 14th Baronet, DL (born 1 June 1937) is an English baronet and retired regular officer of the British Army. He was also an aide-de-camp to Queen Elizabeth II.

Gooch is descended from Sir William Gooch, 1st Baronet, Royal Lieutenant Governor of Virginia from 1727 to 1749, for whom Goochland County, Virginia is named.

The son of Colonel Brian Sherlock Gooch DSO TD and of Monica Mary (née Heywood), Gooch was educated at Eton and Sandhurst, before serving in the Life Guards, the senior regiment of the British Army, which he commanded from 1978 to 1981.

In 1963, he married Sarah Diana Rowena Perceval JP and they have two daughters. Lady Gooch has served as High Sheriff of Wiltshire.

On 14 March 1989, Gooch was appointed as aide-de-camp to Queen Elizabeth II, replacing Brigadier Robert Baddeley. He was Honorary Colonel of the Kent and County of London Yeomanry from 1992 to 1999 and was appointed a Deputy Lieutenant for Wiltshire in 1999.

When his cousin Major Sir Timothy Robert Sherlock Gooch MBE, 13th Baronet, late the Life Guards, died on 9 April 2008, Gooch inherited the baronetcy. His heir presumptive is a brother, Thomas Sherlock Heywood Gooch, who was born on 12 November 1943, in 1971 married Elizabeth Clarice Joan Peyton, and has one son (Robert Brian Sherlock, born 1976) and one daughter.

He is a member of the Army and Navy Club and lives at Chitterne, Wiltshire.

References

1937 births
Living people
Baronets in the Baronetage of Great Britain
British Life Guards officers
Deputy Lieutenants of Wiltshire
People educated at Eton College
British Army brigadiers
Graduates of the Royal Military Academy Sandhurst